The Afulilo Dam is a gravity dam on the Afulilo River about  south of Ta'elefaga in the district of Va'a-o-Fonoti on Upolu island of Samoa. The primary purpose of the dam is hydroelectric power generation and it supports a  power station. It is the largest hydroelectric power station by installed capacity in Samoa. First studied in 1980, construction on the project began in 1990 and the power station was commissioned in 1993. Funding for the US$26.6 million project was provided by the World Bank, Asian Development Bank, International Development Association, European Investment Bank, and European Economic Community loans and grants.

Ta'elefaga Hydroelectric Plant
The penstock terminates at Ta'elefaga Hydroelectric Plant where the water spins two  Pelton turbine-generators. In April 2009 SMEC Holdings was awarded a consultancy contract for this work by the Asian Development Bank.

References

Dams completed in 1993
Dams in Samoa
Gravity dams
Va'a-o-Fonoti